Anions are larger than cations. Large sized anions occupy lattice sites, while small sized cations are found in voids. 
The ratio of radius of cation to anion is called radius ratio.

In condensed matter physics and inorganic chemistry the cation-anion radius ratio (also: radius ratio rule) is the ratio of the ionic radius of the cation to the ionic radius of the anion in a cation-anion compound.

According to Pauling's rules for crystal structures, the allowed size of the cation for a given structure is determined by the critical radius ratio. If the cation is too small, then it will attract the anions into each other and they will collide hence the compound will be unstable due to anion-anion repulsion; this occurs when the radius ratio drops below 0.155.

At the stability limit the cation is touching all the anions and the anions are just touching at their edges (radius ratio = 0.155). For radius ratios greater than 0.155, the compound may be stable.

The table below gives the relation between radius ratio and coordination number, which may be obtained from a simple geometrical proof.

The radius ratio rule was first proposed by Gustav F. Hüttig in 1920. In 1926, Victor Goldschmidt extended the use to ionic lattices.

See also

 Face-centered cubic

References

Crystallography
Inorganic chemistry
Ratios
Atomic radius